Tanur Dar (also Romanized as Tanūr Dar; also known as Tanidar and Shūr Dar) is a village in Zhan Rural District, in the Central District of Dorud County, Lorestan Province, Iran. At the 2006 census, its population was 564, in 99 families.

References 

Towns and villages in Dorud County